Noen Kham is the southwesternmost district (amphoe) of Chai Nat province, central Thailand.

History
The two tambons Noen Kham and Kabok Tia of Hankha district were separated and created the new minor district (king amphoe) on 1 July 1997.

On 15 May 2007, all 81 minor districts were upgraded to full districts. With publication in the Royal Gazette on 24 August the upgrade became official.

Geography
Neighboring districts are (from the north clockwise) Hankha of Chainat Province; Doem Bang Nang Buat and Dan Chang of Suphanburi province; and Ban Rai of Uthai Thani province.

Administration
The district is divided into three sub-districts (tambons), which are further subdivided into 48 villages (mubans). There are no municipal (thesaban) areas, and three tambon administrative organizations (TAO).

References

External links
amphoe.com

Noen Kham